Music by... is an album by American jazz bassist Barre Phillips recorded in 1980 and released on the ECM label.

Track listing
All compositions by Barre Phillips except as indicated
 "Twitter" - 6:18  
 "Angleswaite" - 8:49  
 "Pirthrite" - 5:29  
 "Longview" - 7:35  
 "Entai" - 3:00  
 "Double Treble" (Barre Phillips, Hervé Bourde) - 3:02  
 "Elvid Kursong" - 6:47

Personnel
Barre Phillips — bass
Aina Kemanis, Claudia Phillips — voice
John Surman — soprano saxophone, baritone saxophone, bass clarinet
Hervé Bourde — alto saxophone, tenor saxophone, flutes
Pierre Favre — drums, percussion

References

ECM Records albums
Barre Phillips albums
1980 albums
Albums produced by Manfred Eicher